This is the episode list of the 1980s anime series. For the 2000s series, see List of Cobra the Animation episodes.

The anime series  is based on the manga series of the same name written by Buichi Terasawa. The series is directed by Osamu Dezaki and produced by TMS Entertainment. Loosely based in the first eight volumes of the manga, the episodes follows Cobra, a spatial pirate, who enjoys an adventurous life along with his gynoid partner Armaroid Lady.

Space Cobra broadcast between October 7, 1982 and May 19, 1983 on Fuji Television. On October 25, 2000, the episodes were released in eight DVD compilations as well as a DVD box set by Digital Site. Digital Site also released a later DVD box subtitled  on October 25, 2002. The eight DVDs were later re-released by Happinet on August 29, 2008.

On January 15, 2013, Right Stuf announced they licensed the series to it release in North America. Nozomi Entertainment, a Right Stuf's publishing division, stated it would release the anime in two DVD sets; the first one was released on March 4, 2014, and the second is available since May 6, 2014.

The series use two pieces of theme music, an opening theme and ending theme:  and  both by Yoko Maeno.



Episode list

See also
List of Cobra the Animation episodes

References

Space Cobra
Space Cobra